Michielin is a surname. Notable people with the surname include:

Francesca Michielin (born 1995), Italian singer-songwriter
Rahel Michielin (born 1990), Swiss ice hockey player